Ryoun Yamada, aka Yamada Ryoun or Yamada Masamichi, the son of the late Yamada Koun, is the current Zen master of San'un Zendo in Kamakura, Japan and the Abbot of the Sanbo Zen school of Zen Buddhism. Sanbo Zen  is a lay organization of Zen, so Yamada also worked at Mitsubishi Bank and Mitsubishi Securities. Currently he heads the Itoki Corporation. As of the late 1990s, Yamada was returning to Japan only a few times each year.

See also
Buddhism in Japan

Notes

References

Sanbo Kyodan Buddhists
Zen Buddhist monks
Japanese Zen Buddhists
Year of birth missing (living people)
Living people